Florencia Molinero and Stephanie Vogt were the defending champions, but Molinero chose not to participate. Vogt partnered Réka-Luca Jani, but lost in the final to Başak Eraydın and Lidziya Marozava, 6–4, 6–4.

Seeds

Draw

References 
 Draw

Engie Open de Biarritz - Doubles